Bialik Institute (Mosad Bialik) is a research institution and publishing house, mostly dealing with the history and culture of the Hebrew language. It was established in 1935 by the World Zionist Executive and the Executive of the Jewish Agency and named after the Hebrew poet Hayim Nahman Bialik. Its works are mostly published in Hebrew and in English.

Among the Bialik Institute's most notable publications are:
 Encyclopaedia Biblica - an encyclopedia of the Hebrew Bible in eight volumes (1942−1982), and The Biblical Encyclopaedia Library—a series of books on Semitic languages, Biblical criticism and history of the Middle East.
 A complete collection of David Avidan's poems in four volumes (2008−2011)
 A complete collection of Uri Zvi Grinberg's poems (1991)

External links
 Bialik Institute - official website

Book publishing companies of Israel
Publishing companies established in 1935
Research institutes in Israel
World Zionist Organization
Hebrew language